Mask Island (formerly Welshman’s Island on patent plans of 1861) is an island located at the northern end of Kamaniskeg Lake in Eastern Ontario, Canada. It is near the community of Barry's Bay in Madawaska Valley township, to which it is connected by a causeway. The island was named for Pawel Bronas Mask (1865–1964), a Pole who settled on it in 1918.

References

Lake islands of Ontario
Landforms of Renfrew County